Wietersheim may refer to the following:

Places
Wietersheim, a district in the town of Petershagen, Germany.

Persons
Gustav Anton von Wietersheim (1884 – 1974), German General
Walter von Wietersheim (1917), German Major
Wend von Wietersheim (1900 – 1975), German Lieutenant General